Klukowo  is a village in the administrative district of Gmina Małkinia Górna, within Ostrów Mazowiecka County, Masovian Voivodeship, in east-central Poland.

References

Villages in Ostrów Mazowiecka County